Chris Rodriguez Jr. (born September 26, 2000) is an American football running back for the Kentucky Wildcats.

Early life and high school
Rodriguez grew up in McDonough, Georgia. He played offensive line until he was in seventh grade when he broke his arm and played the fullback position upon returning. 1,669 yards and 25 touchdowns. A 3 star prospect Rodriguez committed to play college football at Kentucky over offers from Ole Miss and Mississippi State.

College career
Rodriguez played in three games and rushed twice for 43 yards in his true freshman season before opting to redshirt the rest of the season. As a redshirt freshman in 2019, he rushed 71 times for 533 yards and six touchdowns. As a redshirt sophomore in 2020, Rodriguez was the Wildcats' leading rusher with 785 yards and 11 touchdowns.

As a redshirt junior in 2021, Rodriguez rushed for 1,272 yards and eight touchdowns on 205 carries during the regular season. He was instrumental in the Wildcats 10-win season; in the 2022 Citrus Bowl against No. 15 Iowa, Rodriguez scored a six-yard touchdown run that gave Kentucky a 20-17 lead with less than two minutes to go in the game. Kentucky would hold on to win the game.

References

External links
 Kentucky bio

Living people
American football running backs
Kentucky Wildcats football players
People from McDonough, Georgia
Players of American football from Georgia (U.S. state)
2000 births